Mohamed Abderrahman Tazi (born 3 July 1942), is a Moroccan filmmaker, screenwriter and cinematographer. One of the most revered artists in Morocco, Tazi has made several critically acclaimed films including 6 et 12, Le Grand Voyage, Les voisins d'Abou Moussa and Al Bayra, la vieille jeune fille. Apart from direction, he is also a producer, writer and cinematographer.

Personal life
He was born on 3 July 1942 in Fez, Morocco. In 1963, he graduated from the Institut des hautes études cinématographiques (IDHEC) in Paris. Then in 1974, he studied communication at the Syracuse University, New York.

Career
In 1964, he produced the documentary Sunab and then the short film Tarfaya, ou la marche d’un poète in 1966. Then in 1967, he worked as the director of photography in the film Quaraouyne and then in 1968 film Du côté de la Tassaout. In 1968, he directed his maiden film 6 et 12.

In 1979, he created the production company "Arts et Techniques Audio-visuels". Later, he became the producer and director of cultural programs for Moroccan Television and Spanish Television. Before the cinema direction, Tazi worked as the technical advisor for the films by Robert Wise and John Huston filmed in Morocco. 

In 1981, he made his first feature film Le Grand Voyage. Then in 1989, he directed and produced critically acclaimed film Badis. With the success of the film, he made In search of my wife's husband in 1994 and Lalla Hobby in 1997. From 2000 to 2003, Tazi was appointed as the Director of productions at the Moroccan television channel 2M TV.

Apart from cinema, he later wrote the book Beyond Casablanca.

Filmography

References

External links
 

1942 births
Living people
Moroccan film directors
Moroccan cinematographers
People from Fez, Morocco
20th-century Moroccan people
21st-century Moroccan people